This is a historical list of all bishops of the Catholic Church whose sees were within the present-day boundaries of the United States, with links to the bishops who consecrated them. It includes only members of the United States Conference of Catholic Bishops and their predecessors.

The number references the sequence of consecration.  "Diocese" refers to the diocese over which the bishop presided or, if he did not preside, the diocese in which he served as coadjutor bishop or auxiliary bishop.  The Roman numeral before the diocese name represents where in the sequence that bishop falls; e.g., the fourth bishop of Philadelphia is written "IV Philadelphia".  Where a diocese is in bold type it indicates that the bishop is the current bishop of that diocese. Titular sees are not listed.  Under consecrators are the numbers (or letters) referencing previous bishops on the list.  The number listed first represents the principal consecrator.  If a series of letters is under "Consecrators", then the consecrators were bishops from outside the United States (the list of foreign sees is at the bottom of the page).  Where the letter "F" is used, it indicates that a priest who was not a bishop assisted in the consecration.

Chart of episcopal succession

1–50

51–100

101–150

151–200

201–250

251–300

301–350

351–400

401–450

451–500

501–550

551–600

601–650

651–700

701–750

751–800

801–850

851–900

901–950

951–1000

1001–1050

1051–1100

1101–1150

1151–1200

1201–1250

1251–1300

1301–1350

1351–1400

1401–1450

1451–1500

1501–1551

Abbreviations and notes

Foreign consecrators

 AA=Titular Bishop of Rama
 AB=Bishop of Havana
 AC=Titular Bishop of Tricala
 AD=Bishop of Mexico
 AE=Titular Bishop of Athens
 AF=Titular Bishop of Cyrene
 AG=Latin Patriarch of Jerusalem
 AH=Titular Bishop of Seleucia
 AI=Titular Bishop of Ephesus
 AJ=Archbishop of Fermo
 AK=Titular Bishop of Ancyra
 AL=Bishop of Porto
 AM=Bishop of Saint-Malo
 AN=Bishop of Terracina, Sezze, and Priverno
 AO=Archbishop of Dublin
 AP=Bishop of Ossory
 AQ=Bishop of Cork
 AR= Titular Bishop of Aria
 AS=Bishop of Kildare and Leighlin
 AT=Archbishop of Cashel
 AU=Archbishop of Rouen
 AV=Bishop of Versailles
 AW=Bishop of Beauvais
 AX=Titular Bishop of Rhesaina
 AY=Bishop of Monterrey
 AZ=Titular Bishop of Tanagra
 BA=Titular Archbishop of Nazianzus
 BB=Titular Archbishop of Tarsus
 BC=Titular Bishop of Porphyreon
 BD=Bishop of Montreal
 BE=Bishop of Kingston
 BF=Titular Bishop of Martyropolis
 BG=Bishop of Halifax
 BH=Titular Bishop of Augustopolis in Phrygia
 BI=Titular Bishop of Trajanopolis
 BJ=Bishop of Belley-Ars
 BK=Bishop of Lausanne
 BL=Titular Archbishop of Thebes
 BM=Bishop of Città di Castello
 BN=Bishop of Ross
 BO=Titular Bishop of Derbe
 BP=Archbishop of Tours
 BQ=Bishop of Le Mans
 BR=Bishop of Toronto
 BS=Bishop of Valence
 BT=Archbishop of Munich and Freising
 BU=Titular Archbishop of Melitene
 BV=Bishop of Osimo and Cingoli
 BW=Bishop of Clermont
 BX=Bishop of Le Puy-en-Velay
 BY=Bishop of Vancouver
 BZ=Archbishop of Rennes
 CA=Bishop of Quimper
 CB=Titular Archbishop of Thessalonica
 CC=Bishop of Fano
 CD=Titular Bishop of Troas
 CE=Vicar Apostolic of Hong Kong
 CF=Bishop of Sankt Gallen
 CG=Bishop of Basel
 CH=Bishop of Barcelona
 CI=Bishop of Vic
 CJ=Bishop of Lleida
 CK=Titular Archbishop of Lepanto
 CL=Bishop of Victoria
 CM=Bishop of San Luis Potosí
 CN=Titular Archbishop of Trapezus
 CO=Titular Archbishop of Nicaea
 CP=Titular Archbishop of Caesarea in Palaestina
 CQ=Titular Archbishop of Nicopolis in Epiro
 CR=Titular Archbishop of Laodicea in Phyrgia
 CS=Titular Archbishop of Tyana
 CT=Archbishop of Santiago de Cuba
 CU=Titular Archbishop of Larissa in Thessalia
 CV=Metropolitan of Lviv
 CW=Bishop of Przemyśl
 CX=Bishop of Stanislaviv
 CY=Titular Bishop of Petra
 CZ=Titular Bishop of Philadelphia in Lydia
 DA=Titular Archbishop of Darnis
 DB=Titular Archbishop of Edessa
 DC=Titular Archbishop of Corinth
 DD=Titular Bishop of Sinitis
 DE=Archbishop of Winnipeg
 DF=Bishop of Sabina
 DG=Titular Archbishop of Colossae
 DH=Titular Bishop of Tiberias
 DI=Titular Bishop of Lydda
 DJ=Bishop of Jaro
 DK=Eparch of Križevci
 DL=Eparch of Lungro
 DM=Bishop of Morelia
 DN=Titular Archbishop of Caesarea in Mauretania
 DO=Titular Bishop of Lampsacus
 DP=Titular Bishop of Themisonium
 DQ=Bishop of Macau
 DR=Bishop of Nueva Segovia
 DS=Titular Archbishop of Dioclea
 DT=Cardinal Priest of Santi Giovanni e Paolo, Rome
 DU=Titular Archbishop of Heraclea in Europe
 DV=Titular Archbishop of Philippopolis in Thrace
 DW=Titular Bishop of Tuscamia
 DX=Titular Archbishop of Apamea in Syria
 DY=Titular Archbishop of Theodosiopolis in Arcadia
 DZ=Ukrainian Catholic Archeparch of Winnipeg
 EA=Ukrainian Catholic Eparch of Edmonton
 EB=Bishop of Nelson
 EC=Titular Archbishop of Philippi
 ED=Titular Archbishop of Neapolis in Pisidia
 EE=Titular Bishop of Lystra
 EF=Bishop of Basse-Terre
 EG=Titular Archbishop of Myra
 EH=Greek Catholic Patriarch of Antioch
 EI=Titular Archbishop of Pelusium
 EJ=Titular Archbishop of Nubia
 EK=Titular Archbishop of Adana
 EL=Bishop of Imola
 EM=Ukrainian Catholic Eparch of Toronto
 EN=Titular Archbishop of Severiana
 EO=Archbishop of Guatemala
 EP=Bishop of San Marcos
 EQ=Maronite Catholic Patriarch of Antioch
 ER=Titular Archbishop of Nisibi of the Maronites
 ES=Bishop of Baalbek of the Maronites
 ET=Archbishop of Gwangju
 EU=Archbishop of Aleppo of the Greek Melkite Catholics
 EV=Archbishop of Acre of the Greek Melkite Catholics
 EW=Archbishop of Latakia of the Greek Melkite Catholics
 EX=Titular Archbishop of Christopolis
 EY=Bishop of Comayagua
 EZ=Titular Archbishop of Malliana
 FA=Titular Bishop of Putia in Numidia
 FB=Titular Bishop of Hermonthis
 FC=Titular Bishop of Tzernicus
 FD=Titular Archbishop of Iconium
 FE=Titular Archbishop of Serdica
 FF=Archbishop of Utrecht
 FG=Archbishop of Armagh
 FH=Bishop of Nassau
 FI=Titular Archbishop of Zuri
 FJ=Archbishop of Cali
 FK=Archbishop of Tamale
 FL=Bishop of Arecibo
 FM=Bishop of Mayagüez
 FN=Archbishop of Bangalore
 FO=Titular Archbishop of Thagora
 FP=Bishop of Coroico
 FQ=Armenian Catholic Patriarch of Cilicia
 FR=Titular Archbishop of Colonia
 FS=Titular Archbishop of Comana
 FT=Bishop of Tehuacán
 FU=Titular Archbishop of Feradi Maius
 FV=Chaldean Catholic Patriarch of Babylon
 FW=Titular Archbishop of Kaškar of the Chaldeans
 FX=Chaldean Catholic Archeparch of Mosul
 FY=Archbishop of Erbil of the Chaldeans
 FZ=Archbishop of Basra of the Chaldeans
 GA=Chaldean Catholic Bishop of Alqosh
 GB=Chaldean Catholic Bishop of Aqra
 GC=Titular Archbishop of Drivastum
 GD=Titular Archbishop of Mauriana
 GE=Titular Bishop of Bosana
 GF=Archbishop of Cotonou
 GG=Titular Archbishop of Novaliciana
 GH=Bishop of Marbel
 GI=Melkite Eparch of Saint-Sauveur de Montréal
 GJ=Titular Archbishop of Vescovio
 GK=Melkite Greek Eparch of Nuestra Señora del Paraíso en México
 GL=Titular Archbishop of Palmyra of the Greek Melkites
 GM=Titular Archbishop of Amiternum
 GN=Titular Archbishop of Tharros
 GO=Bishop of Saint John's-Basseterre
 GP=Titular Archbishop of Neapolis in Proconsulari
 GQ=Bishop of Opole
 GR=Titular Archbishop of Apollonia
 GS=Titular Bishop of Amida of the Armenians
 GT=Syriac Catholic Patriarch of Antioch
 GU=Archbishop of Damascus of the Syriacs
 GV=Archbishop of Aleppo of the Syriacs
 GW=Titular Archbishop of Horta
 GX=Ukrainian Catholic Eparch of Saskatoon
 GY=Greek Catholic Archbishop of Făgăraş and Alba Iulia
 GZ=Archeparch of Antelias of the Maronites
 HA=Titular Archbishop of Africa
 HB=Titular Archbishop of Celene
 HC=Titular Bishop of Rusellae
 HD=Titular Bishop of Acre of the Maronites
 HE=Titular Archbishop of Nova Caesaris
 HF=Titular Bishop of Cilibia
 HG=Major Archbishop of Ernakulam-Angamaly
 HH=Bishop of Palai
 HI=Bishop of Kottayam
 HJ=Bishop of Saint George's in Grenada
 HK=Bishop of Nuevo Laredo
 HL=Titular Bishop of Castellum Ripae
 HM=Titular Archbishop of Coeliana
 HN=Titular Archbishop of Tagritum
 HO=Archbishop of Trivandrum
 HP=Bishop of Muvattupuzha
 HQ=Bishop of Mavelikara
 HR=Bishop of Frascati
 HS=Archbishop of Ljubljana
 HT=Vicar General of Rome
 HW=Archbishop of Aleppo of the Armenians
 HX=Archbishop of Adana of the Armenians
 HY=Military Ordinary of Poland
 HZ=Bishop of Kingston in Jamaica
 IA=Bishop of Irinjalakuda
 IB=Archbishop of Tegucigalpa
 IC=Bishop of San Isidro de El General
 ID=Bishop of Regensburg
 IE=Titular Bishop of Cresima
 IF=Titular Bishop of Serta
 IG=Bishop of Montego Bay
 IH=Titular Bishop of Novi
 II=Ukrainian Catholic Archeparchy of Lviv
 IJ=Ukrainian Catholic Eparchy of Sambir-Drohobych
 IK=Slovak Catholic Metropolitan Archeparchy of Prešov
 IL=Slovak Catholic Eparchy of Košice
 IM=Slovak Catholic Eparchy of Bratislava
 IN=Patriarch of Babylon of the Chaldeans
 IO=Chaldean Catholic Patriarchate of Babylon
 IP=Major Archbishop of Kyiv-Galicia
 IQ=Ukrainian Catholic Bishop of Edmonton
 IR=Archeparch of Tiruvalla
 IS=Eparch of Pathanamthitta
 IT=Bishop of Matamoros
 IU=Titular Archbishop of Gunela
 IV=Archbishop of St Andrews and Edinburgh
 IW=Melkite Catholic Patriarchate of Antioch

Other abbreviations
F=Priest who was not a bishop
PP=Pope
PR=Bishop of Puerto Rico

Notes

See also

 Appointment of Catholic bishops
 Catholic Church hierarchy
 Catholic Church in the United States
 Historical list of the Catholic bishops of Puerto Rico
 List of bishops of the Episcopal Church in the United States of America
 List of Catholic bishops of the United States
 Lists of patriarchs, archbishops, and bishops

Bibliography
Bishops numbered 1 through 1061 are sourced in Bransom (1990). Bishops numbered 1062 and higher are sourced in Cheney (2014).

Sources